The Austrian Peace Service is one of the three sections of the non-profit organisation Austrian Service Abroad and offers a 6-12 months voluntary service at its partner institutions. Male Austrians may accredit their Austrian Peace Service as an alternative to the Austrian national or military service, provided their service abroad lasted a minimum of 10 months. Austrian Peace Servants are financially supported by the Austrian government.

General 
Austrian Peace Servants are sent to partner institutions relating to peace and conflict research, peace education, reconciliation initiatives and the commemoration of atrocities other than the Holocaust.

Partner organizations

Belgium
 Brussels - European Institute of Peace
 Brussels - B'nai B'rith
Bosnia and Herzegovina
  Donji Potočari - Srebrenica Genocide Memorial
China
 Beijing - Beijing International Peace Culture Foundation
 Nanjing - John Rabe House 
Croatia
 Osijek - Centre for Peace, Nonviolence and Human Rights
Georgia
 Tbilisi - Act 4 Transformation Caucasus Office
Japan
 Hiroshima - Hiroshima Peace Memorial Museum
Netherlands
 Amsterdam - UNITED for Intercultural Action (2002 - 2010)
 The Hague - Peace Palace
Rwanda
 Kigali - Kigali Genocide Memorial
Serbia
 Belgrade - Haver Srbija
South Africa
 Simonstown - Simon's Town Museum
Spain
 Gernika - Gernika Gogoratuz Research Centre
United States
 Dayton - Dayton International Peace Museum
 New York - International Peace Institute
 Oklahoma City - First Americans Museum

See also
Austrian Service Abroad
Austrian Holocaust Memorial Service
Austrian Social Service
House of Responsibility
Andreas Maislinger
Michael Prochazka

External links
 Austrian Service Abroad

Non-profit organisations based in Austria
Non-governmental organizations involved in the Israeli–Palestinian conflict
1998 establishments in Austria